LATAM Ecuador serves the following destinations:

References

Lists of airline destinations
LAN Airlines